Edward Dewey Graham (May 18, 1898December 5, 1967) was an American college football and baseball player and coach. He served as the head football coach at Norwich University from 1926 to 1930.

Graham attended Portsmouth High School in Portsmouth, New Hampshire, where he was team captain in 1914. He then played college football for New Hampshire College of Agriculture and the Mechanic Arts (which became the University of New Hampshire in 1923) where he was captain of the 1919 team. He earned a Bachelor of Science degree from New Hampshire in 1922.

Graham served in the United States Navy from 1917 to 1919. He made an inter-service transfer to the united States Army in 1922, where served first in costal artillery and later in field artillery. He was commander of costal defense in the Netherlands Antilles Command from 1940 to 1945, and retired from active service with the rank of colonel.

Graham died on December 5, 1967, in Providence, Rhode Island.

References

External links
 

1898 births
1967 deaths
New Hampshire Wildcats football coaches
New Hampshire Wildcats football players
Norwich Cadets baseball coaches
Norwich Cadets football coaches
United States Army officers
United States Navy personnel of World War I
High school football coaches in Vermont
People from Kittery, Maine
People from Portsmouth, New Hampshire
Coaches of American football from New Hampshire
Players of American football from New Hampshire
Baseball coaches from New Hampshire
Military personnel from New Hampshire